Reynolds Peak is a 9,690-foot-elevation (2,954 meter) mountain summit located in Alpine County, California, United States.

Description
Reynolds Peak is situated on the crest of the Sierra Nevada mountain range, with precipitation runoff from the peak draining west to the North Fork Mokelumne River, and east into tributaries of the East Fork Carson River. The Pacific Crest Trail traverses the eastern base of the mountain, providing an approach option from Ebbetts Pass.

Etymology

At the recommendation of the US Forest Service, this landform's toponym was officially adopted in 1929 by the U.S. Board on Geographic Names to honor Gilbert Elmer Reynolds (1884–1928), for many years the managing editor of the Stockton Record and an advocate of forest conservation. He was a member of the Sierra Club and one of California's leading conservationists. He died at his office on July 21, 1928, of a heart attack at age 44, and was buried at the Stockton Rural Cemetery.

Climate
According to the Köppen climate classification system, Reynolds Peak is located in an alpine climate zone. Most weather fronts originate in the Pacific Ocean and travel east toward the Sierra Nevada mountains. As fronts approach, they are forced upward by the peaks (orographic lift), causing them to drop their moisture in the form of rain or snowfall onto the range.

Gallery

See also

References

External links
 Weather forecast: Reynolds Peak
 Gilbert Elmer Reynolds in memoriam: Recordnet.com

North American 2000 m summits
Mountains of Northern California
Mountains of the Sierra Nevada (United States)
Mountains of Alpine County, California
Humboldt–Toiyabe National Forest
Stanislaus National Forest